TV2000 is an Italy-based broadcasting network that carries Roman Catholic-themed programming, available on digital terrestrial television in Italy and owned by the Italian Episcopal Conference, the conference of the Catholic bishops of Italy.

Launched as Sat 2000 in 1998 and so renamed in 2009, it is broadcast in Italy on DTT channel 28 on mux TIMB 2, via satellite Hot Bird 13B at 13°Est (12092 MHz, pol.H, Sr 29900,3/4  and Eutelsat 9B at 9°Est (12466 MHz, pol.V, Sr 41950, 3/4).

Programming

Religious programs 
 Holy Mass broadcast by the Centro Televisivo Vaticano
 The Holy Rosary from Lourdes.

Other programs 
 Actuality programs like Nel cuore dei giorni
 Information like TG2000 
 Educational and inspirational programming such as documentaries from National Geographic Society 
 Television series such as Don Matteo from RAI 
 Talk shows such as  Romanzo familiare
 Classical music concerts
 Current affairs programming

See also 
 Catholic television
 Catholic television channels
 Catholic television networks
 Padre Pio TV
 Telepace
 Vatican Media

References

External links 
Official Website 

Mass media in Rome
Free-to-air
Catholic television networks
Italian-language television stations
Television channels and stations established in 1998
Television channels in Italy